Ssssh is the third studio album by blues rock band Ten Years After, released in 1969. The album charted #20 on the Billboard 200 and #4 on the UK charts.

Track listing
All songs composed by Alvin Lee, except where noted.

Side one
"Bad Scene" – 3:20
"Two Time Mama" – 2:05
"Stoned Woman" – 3:25
"Good Morning Little Schoolgirl" (Sonny Boy Williamson) – 6:34

Side two
"If You Should Love Me" – 5:25
"I Don't Know That You Don't Know My Name" – 1:56
"The Stomp" – 4:34
"I Woke Up This Morning" – 5:25

Personnel
Ten Years After
Alvin Lee – guitar, vocals
Leo Lyons – bass
Ric Lee – drums
Chick Churchill – organ

References

External links

1969 albums
Ten Years After albums
Chrysalis Records albums
Decca Records albums
Deram Records albums
Albums recorded at Morgan Sound Studios